ML-18 was a British motor launch boat that disappeared in the North Sea while on passage from Norway.

Construction 
ML-18 was constructed in 1915 by the Electric Launch Company. She was completed in 1915 and served from 1915 until her loss in 1919.

The ship was assessed at 37 disp with a diesel engine that could reach a speed of 19 knots.

Disappearance 
On 29 September 1919, ML-18 along with ML-62 and ML-191 were on passage from Norway when they disappeared in the North Sea. The crew and ships were never found; the number of casualties is unknown.

References

1915 ships
Maritime incidents in 1919
Missing ships
Ships lost with all hands
Ships of the Royal Navy
Shipwrecks in the North Sea